"In the Walls of Eryx" is a short story by American writers H. P. Lovecraft and Kenneth J. Sterling, written in January 1936 and first published in Weird Tales magazine in October 1939. It is a science fiction story involving space exploration in the near future.

Plot

The story, written in first-person narrative is Lovecraft's first and only foray into science fiction, and depicts the life and death of a prospector on the planet Venus who, while working for a mining company, becomes trapped in an invisible maze.

The story takes place in the future, when humanity has developed space travel and begun to explore Venus. There, they discover valuable crystal orbs that can be used as a source of electrical power, as well as a race of primitive lizardmen who guard the crystals fervently and who attack any humans who try to take them.

The narrator, Kenton J. Stanfield, is one of many explorers employed to collect the crystals. He is equipped with a breathing apparatus fueled by oxygen cubes (as Venus' atmosphere cannot sustain human life) and has a leather protective suit, as well as a "flame pistol" to use against lizardmen.

While on a routine mission, the narrator encounters a bizarre structure: a maze whose walls are completely invisible, inside of which is a crystal of unusually large size. The prize is held by a dead prospector. The protagonist, feeling confident he can map out the maze, makes his way to the center after collecting the crystal in order to explore the structure. However, he soon discovers that he has misjudged the maze, and is unable to relocate the entrance point.

Trapped in the maze, the narrator's oxygen and water supply steadily begins to run out, and lizardmen soon begin to gather at the outside of the maze to observe and mock him. Realizing the futility of his situation, the narrator begins to grasp the religious significance of the crystals to the lizardmen, and also realizes that the maze's nature as a constructed structure, and as a trap, indicates that the lizardmen are actually more intelligent than the humans are willing to admit. In time he realizes that he will face the same fate as the preceding prospector.

Dying, the narrator writes down his observations on a futuristic form of recording paper. He describes how in his last moments he has developed a feeling of kinship with the lizardmen, and pleads with his superiors to leave Venus, the lizardmen, and the crystals alone, as they hold mysteries humanity cannot begin to grasp, and mankind does not really need to exploit them.

The narrator's testimony, along with his body, are soon recovered by a search party, who discover an additional exit just behind the ground where Stanfield died, which the prospector missed when attempting to map out the maze. However, his dying pleas for humanity to leave Venus alone are dismissed by his employers as unfortunate dementia caused by his desperate situation, and instead the crystal mining company decides to use draconian measures to annihilate the lizardmen completely.

Analysis
The name of the story's main character, Kenton J. Stanfield, closely resembles that of its co-author, Kenneth J. Sterling. Eryx, or the Erycinian Highland, is a (fictional) vast plateau on Venus. Unlike the actual planet, Lovecraft's Venus has a tropical climate and is filled with lush, swampy jungles, though its atmosphere is poisonous to humans, while at the same time not so dangerous as to require hermetically sealed space suits.

The themes of prejudice, religious intolerance, and discrimination are evident in the story. The references in the story to "wriggling akmans" and "efjeh-weeds" are believed to be jokes aimed at Forrest J Ackerman, a correspondent with whom Lovecraft feuded over Ackerman's criticism of a Clark Ashton Smith story.

The story contains several other in-jokes, including references to "farnoth flies" (for Weird Tales editor Farnsworth Wright) and "ugrats" (derived from "Hugo the Rat", Lovecraft's unaffectionate nickname for Wonder Stories editor Hugo Gernsback).

Writing
Sterling, a precocious Providence high school student who had befriended Lovecraft the previous year, gave Lovecraft a draft of the story in January 1936. This draft included the idea of an invisible maze—a concept Sterling recalled as being derived from the story "The Monster-God of Mamurth" by Edmond Hamilton, published in the August 1926 issue of Weird Tales, which featured an invisible building in the Sahara Desert.

Lovecraft thoroughly rewrote Sterling's draft, lengthening the story to 12,000 words (from an original 6,000-8,000). Though the original draft does not survive, most of the prose in the published version is believed to be Lovecraft's.

Reception
The story seems to have been rejected by Weird Tales, Astounding Stories, Blue Book, Argosy, Wonder Stories, and possibly Amazing Stories. After Lovecraft's death, it was resubmitted to Weird Tales and finally published in its October 1939 issue.

References

Sources 
 Definitive version.

External links

 In the Walls of Eryx by H.P. Lovecraft & Kenneth Sterling
 Toolband.com Newsletter featuring 4:20 theory

1939 short stories
Fiction about invisibility
Collaborative short stories
Science fiction short stories
Short stories by H. P. Lovecraft
Short stories published posthumously
Short stories set on Venus
Works originally published in Weird Tales
Short stories set in the future